The People's Republic of China competed at the 1984 Winter Olympics in Sarajevo, Yugoslavia.

Alpine skiing

Men

Women

Biathlon

Men

Men's 4 x 7.5 km relay

 1 A penalty loop of 150 metres had to be skied per missed target.
 2 One minute added per missed target.

Cross-country skiing

Men

Men's 4 × 10 km relay

Women

Women's 4 × 5 km relay

Figure skating

Men

Women

Pairs

Ice Dancing

Speed skating

Men

Women

References
Official Olympic Reports
 Olympic Winter Games 1984, full results by sports-reference.com

Nations at the 1984 Winter Olympics
1984
Winter Olympics